Jeffrey Hamet O'Neal ( 1760–1772), was an Irish miniature-painter. He practised for many years in London as a miniature-painter, and exhibited occasionally with the Incorporated Society of Artists, of which he was a fellow, being one of the artists who signed the declaration roll in 1766. O'Neal is also stated to have painted landscapes, natural history, and ‘Japan’ pieces; the last for a printseller in Cheapside. In 1772 he was living in Lawrence Street, Chelsea.

References

 Sheila O’Connell and Rosemary Baker, 'Satirical Prints by Jefferyes Hamett O’Neale', Print Quarterly, XXVIII, 2011, 338-43

Attribution

Irish artists
Portrait miniaturists
Year of birth missing
Year of death missing